Hoye-Crest is a summit along Backbone Mountain just inside of Garrett County, Maryland.

The location, named for Captain Charles E. Hoye (1876–1951), founder of the Garrett County Historical Society, offers a view of the North Branch Potomac River valley to the east.  The Maryland Historical Society placed a historical marker at the summit during a dedication ceremony in September 1952.

Accessing Hoye-Crest 

There is no vehicular access to Hoye-Crest. The trail ascends Backbone Mountain along an old logging road on Monongahela National Forest property to the West Virginia-Maryland state line. The distance is about one mile each way. The trail then heads north along the state line to the high point. Hoye-Crest sits on private property (Western Pocahontas Properties), though access is permitted.

See also

 List of U.S. states by elevation
 Backbone Mountain
 Monongahela National Forest
 Meshach Browning

References

External links
 

Mountains of Maryland
Landforms of Garrett County, Maryland
Highest points of U.S. states
North American 1000 m summits